Malcolm Richard Wood (February 29, 1936 – April 4, 2015) was an American football quarterback and coach who played college football at Auburn and professionally in the American Football League (AFL). After his player career ended, Wood served as an assistant coach in college football and the NFL over four decades.

As a player 
Playing for Lanett High School, Wood was named to the All-State team in Alabama in 1954. He went on to help lead Auburn to an undefeated season in 1958. He was drafted by the Baltimore Colts of the National Football League (NFL) in 1959.  He never played for the Colts, and signed with the Denver Broncos of the American Football League (AFL) as a free agent in 1962. Later in that season, Wood saw his first significant playing time as a member of the San Diego Chargers, playing in 6 games and starting 2 (he filled in for teammates Jack Kemp and John Hadl). He then spent two seasons (1963 and 1964) with the New York Jets, starting 12 games in each year. The Jets drafted Joe Namath in 1965, and Wood landed as a backup for the Oakland Raiders, starting 3 games in relief of Tom Flores. The next year, he was a member of the Miami Dolphins' inaugural season.

Coaching career
In the next 30 years after his playing days, Wood held over a dozen offensive assistant coaching positions. He worked under Hank Stram in New Orleans as a quarterbacks coach, with Archie Manning under center. Afterwards, he was on the staff of the first Atlanta Falcons team to reach the playoffs in 1978. He coached Randall Cunningham and the Philadelphia Eagles during the early 1990s. He retired from coaching in 1997.

Statistics and legacy
Wood started 33 games and completed 522 career passes for 51 touchdowns and 71 interceptions in his professional career.

He played for five different AFL teams during his football career, the only player to ever do so.

Wood was the first quarterback to throw for a touchdown at Shea Stadium.

In 1966, Wood became the first starting quarterback in Miami Dolphins history.

Outside of football 
Wood was married to Peggy Bartlett, who was also from his hometown of Lanett. The couple had a daughter and a son. After suffering from dementia, Wood died in Atlanta. He was 79.

See also
 List of American Football League players

References

1936 births
2015 deaths
People from Lanett, Alabama
Players of American football from Alabama
American football quarterbacks
Auburn Tigers football players
Denver Broncos (AFL) players
San Diego Chargers players
New York Jets players
Oakland Raiders players
Miami Dolphins players
American Football League players
Coaches of American football from Alabama
Georgia Bulldogs football coaches
Oakland Raiders coaches
Ole Miss Rebels football coaches
Cleveland Browns coaches
New Orleans Saints coaches
Atlanta Falcons coaches
Auburn Tigers football coaches
Kansas City Chiefs coaches
New England Patriots coaches
Philadelphia Eagles coaches
New York Jets coaches